Vyacheslav Fyodorovich Marushko (2 September 1938 - 7 November 1999) was a Soviet football player and coach.

Honours
 Soviet Top League winner: 1965.

International career
Marushko played his only game for USSR on September 4, 1965 in a friendly against Yugoslavia.

External links
  Profile

1938 births
1999 deaths
Soviet footballers
Soviet Union international footballers
FC Shinnik Yaroslavl players
FC Lokomotiv Moscow players
FC Torpedo Moscow players
Soviet Top League players
Russian footballers
Association football defenders
Association football midfielders
FC Dynamo Makhachkala players